The Westphalian is a stage in the regional stratigraphy of northwest Europe with an age between roughly 313 and 304 Ma (million years ago). It is a subdivision of the Carboniferous system or period and the regional Silesian series. The Westphalian is named for the region of Westphalia (German: Westfalen) in western Germany  where strata of this age occur. The Coal Measures of  England and Wales are also largely of Westphalian age though they also extend into the succeeding Stephanian.

The Westphalian age is preceded by the Namurian stage/age (which corresponds to the Millstone Grit Series of Great Britain) and succeeded by the Stephanian stage/age (which corresponds to the uppermost part of the Coal Measures of Great Britain). In the official geologic timescale of the ICS, the Westphalian is placed within the Pennsylvanian epoch (318-299 Ma).

The (regionally defined) Westphalian stage corresponds to the upper part of the (internationally used) Bashkirian stage together with the whole of the Moscovian and Kasimovian stages. Frequent references appear in scientific literature to a Westphalian epoch or Westphalian series reflecting the stage's earlier status.

Life
Amphibians were diverse and dominated communities. The collapse of the rainforest ecology between the Moscovian and Kasimovian removed many amphibian species who did not survive as well in the cooler, drier conditions. Reptiles, however prospered due to specific key adaptations and underwent a major evolutionary radiation, in response to the drier climate that led to the rainforest collapse.

References

Carboniferous geochronology
Pennsylvanian geochronology
.
Carboniferous Germany
Kasimovian
Moscovian (Carboniferous)
Stratigraphy of Europe